"Cha Cha Slide" is a song by American artist DJ Casper. The song was released as a single in August 2000 and spent five weeks on the Billboard Hot 100 chart, peaking at number 83. It continued to be a chart hit around the world for four years, topping the UK Singles Chart in March 2004.

The song was also part of an 11-track album, Cha Cha Slide: The Original Slide Album, released in September 2000. Initially aimed at aerobic sessions and nightclubs alike, the song is often played at dance clubs, school dances, prom nights, birthday parties, ice-skating rinks and roller rinks, bar mitzvahs, quinceañeras, weddings, and sporting events in the United States, United Kingdom, Canada and different countries.

History

"Casper Slide" Pts 1 and 2
DJ Casper originally wrote "The Cha-Cha Slide" as a step aerobics routine for his nephew, who was working at the time as a personal trainer at a fitness club. Perry wrote and recorded his performance of the original version of the song, titled "Casper Slide Part 1" in January 1998.

The song was inspired by the Chicago stepping movement. Around June 12, 1999, Perry recorded a second version of the song, entitled "Casper Slide Part 2," at the home studio of Fred Johnson with the help of Hollywood Scott, band leader for the Platinum Band.

Perry recorded and released the song at his own expense, and manufactured copies and distributed them with the help of Gardner Douglas ("Cisco"), owner of the Cisco's Music World record stores in Chicago, Illinois. The song was played at various nightclubs and was used by Perry's nephew, a fitness trainer at Bally Total Fitness Health Club in Chicago's Hyde Park neighborhood, as the music for a step aerobics class.

"Cha Cha Slide"
DJ Casper enlisted the help of M.O.B. Music Publishing to produce, edit, and engineer the new version of the song "Cha Cha Slide". Men On Business also produced several other accompanying songs to produce the entire Slide Album. DJ Casper and Men On Business licensed the Slide Album to Universal Records, and it was released on September 19, 2000.

Once it was Universal's project, "we made some instructional 'Cha-Cha Slide' dance videos and distributed them to clubs," said Senior VP of Urban Promotion Michael Horton. "We also promoted the song at various black functions, such as homecoming events at black colleges." The song then made its way to R&B/hip hop station WGCI-FM, in DJ Casper's hometown of Chicago.

In 2001, the following year, the dance caught on around Canada and the United States, where urban contemporary radio stations (and later mobile DJs) played the song continuously, particularly in Chicago, Houston, Atlanta, Arkansas, Memphis, and Detroit. In March 2004, the "Cha Cha Slide" was released in the United Kingdom, and went on to top the UK Singles Chart. Its success in the United Kingdom was helped by Scott Mills of BBC Radio 1, who promoted the song on his weekday afternoon radio show.

Music video
At the beginning of the video, a news van arrives in front of a crowd of people doing the dance on a sidewalk. After that, the reporter reports about the dance. Then, the video transitions to several scenes, including DJ Casper dancing with a group of people on a white background and different people in various locations doing said dance. Near the end of the video, the news camera crew begins dancing a bit. In the last scene, the reporter dances with them.

Track listing

Charts

Weekly charts

Year-end charts

Certifications

Release history

Crazy Frog version

On August 25, 2009, Crazy Frog released "Cha Cha Slide" for the album Everybody Dance Now.

Charts

References

External links
 

2000 debut singles
2004 singles
2009 singles
2000 songs
All Around the World Productions singles
Crazy Frog songs
DJ Casper songs
Group dances
Line dances
Number-one singles in Scotland
Songs about dancing
UK Singles Chart number-one singles
Universal Records singles